Roberto Scalzone (28 May 1962 - 18 July 2019) was an Italian sport shooter who won a medal at individual senior level at the World Championships.

He was the son of the Italian Olympic shooter Angelo Scalzone.

References

External links
 

1962 births
2019 deaths
Trap and double trap shooters
Italian male sport shooters
Place of birth missing
20th-century Italian people